Court of Foxes is a 1969 historical adventure romance novel by the British writer Christianna Brand. During the late eighteenth century Marchesa Marigelda, a celebrated London society lady, operates a double life as a highwaymen. It marked a change of genre for Brand who is best known for her murder mysteries.

References

Bibliography
 Macdonald, Gina. British Mystery and Thriller Writers Since 1960. Gale Group, 2003.
 Reilly, John M. Twentieth Century Crime & Mystery Writers. Springer, 2015.

1969 British novels
Novels by Christianna Brand
British historical novels
Novels set in the 18th century
Novels set in London
Michael Joseph books
British romance novels